Inon Barnatan (born 1979 in Tel Aviv, Israel) is an American/Israeli classical pianist.

Biography
Inon Barnatan lives in New York City.

Music career
He studied with Victor Derevianko, Maria Curcio and Christopher Elton at The Royal Academy of Music. Barnatan often performs works by contemporary composers such as George Crumb, George Benjamin, Kaija Saariaho, and Judith Weir. He regularly performs with cellist Alisa Weilerstein.

In 2014 Barnatan became the first Artist in Association at the New York Philharmonic. The New York Times listed his album Darknesse Visible as one of the best classical recordings of 2012.

Barnatan has received many awards, including an Avery Fisher Career Grant in 2009 and the Andrew Wolf Memorial Award.

In 2019, Barnatan debuted with the record label PENTATONE.

Recordings 
Beethoven Cello Sonatas (2022) - with Alisa Weilerstein on Pentatone 
Beethoven - Piano Concertos Part 2 (2020) with Alan Gilbert, Lydia Teuscher, Toby Spence, Amy Lyddon, Rosie Aldridge, Ben Bevan, Neal Davies , Academy of St Martin in the Fields , London Voices (PENTATONE)
Beethoven - Piano Concertos Part 1 (2019) with Stefan Jackiw, Alisa Weilerstein, Alan Gilbert , Academy of St Martin in the Fields (PENTATONE)
Schubert Late Sonatas (2013)
Darknesse Visible (2012)
Works for Piano and Violin (2010) with Liza Ferschtman
Inon Barnatan Plays Schubert (2010)

References

External links

https://www.youtube.com/user/fidelio567

1979 births
Living people
Israeli classical pianists
People from Tel Aviv
Jewish classical pianists
21st-century classical pianists